Samer Ozeir (born December 2, 1992 in Michigan United States) is a former Lebanese-American professional basketball player who played for Champville SC in the Lebanese basketball league. He also played for the junior Lebanon national basketball team in 2010 and 2011. Samer retired from basketball in 2018.

References

External links 
 

1992 births
Living people
Lebanese men's basketball players
People from Novi, Michigan
Centers (basketball)